Charles Dallas Hicks (December 26, 1927 – May 4, 2021) was an American actor and stuntman. During World War II, Hicks served in the U.S. Merchant Marine and later in the Navy. While in the Navy, he was the boxing champ of the United States Fifth Fleet. He also attended Loyola Marymount University, where he played football and boxed, and later inducted into the school's Athletes Hall of Fame. He also played semi-pro football for the Eagle Rock Athletic Club.
Hicks played Federal Agent LaMarr Kane in the first season of the ABC/Desilu television series The Untouchables starring Robert Stack.

Early life
Hicks attended Burbank High School, where he was senior class president in 1946 and played football.

Death
Hicks died in Las Vegas, Nevada, on May 4, 2021, at the age of 93. His son said that his cause of death was complications from a stroke he had suffered at the end of 2020.

Selected filmography

She's Working Her Way Through College (1952) - Football Player (uncredited)
Francis Goes to West Point (1952) - Minor Role (uncredited)
The Rose Bowl Story (1952) - Fowler (uncredited)
Horizons West (1952) - Barfly (uncredited)
Angel Face (1953) - Nightclub Patron (uncredited)
Lili (1953) - Carnival Patron (uncredited)
Gentlemen Prefer Blondes (1953) - Olympic Team Member (uncredited)
The Caddy (1953) - Caddy (uncredited)
Casanova's Big Night (1954) - Assistant Headsman (uncredited)
River of No Return (1954) - Prospector (uncredited)
White Christmas (1954) - Anniversary Party Guest (uncredited)
Battle Cry (1955) - Marine in Hospital (uncredited)
Blackboard Jungle (1955) - Applicant (uncredited)
Creature with the Atom Brain (1955) - Pilot (uncredited)
Rebel Without a Cause (1955) - Ambulance Attendant (uncredited)
Around the World in 80 Days (1956) - Minor Role (uncredited)
The Girl He Left Behind (1956) - Minor Role (uncredited)
Zombies of Mora Tau (1957) - Zombie (uncredited)
Designing Woman (1957) - Galatos (uncredited)
Gunfire at Indian Gap (1957) - Deputy
Onionhead (1958) - Minor Role (uncredited)
The Last Hurrah (1958) - Fighter (uncredited)
Home Before Dark (1958) - Male Attendant (uncredited)
The Perfect Furlough (1958) - Soldier (uncredited)
Up Periscope (1959) - Sailor (uncredited)
The Untouchables (1959, TV Series) - LaMarr Kane
Ice Palace (1960) - Doughboy (uncredited)
The Bramble Bush (1960) - State Trooper (uncredited)
Sunrise at Campobello (1960) - Policeman (uncredited)
A Fever in the Blood (1961) - Bailiff (uncredited)
All Hands on Deck (1961) - Sailor (uncredited)
Merrill's Marauders (1962) - Cpl. Doskis
Hell Is for Heroes (1962) - Wounded Prisoner (uncredited)
Black Gold (1962) - Bartender (uncredited)
Days of Wine and Roses (1962) - Attendant (uncredited)
PT 109 (1963) - Cook (uncredited)
Shock Corridor (1963) - Tough Attendant
The Man from Galveston (1963) - US Marshal Chuck (uncredited)
4 for Texas (1963) - Fighter (uncredited)
Robin and the 7 Hoods (1964) - Factory Worker (uncredited)
Kisses for My President (1964) - Senator (uncredited)
The Great Race (1965) - Saloon Brawler (uncredited)
The Third Day (1965) - Policeman (uncredited)
Our Man Flint (1966) - Guard (uncredited)
The Silencers (1966) - Armed Man (uncredited)
Johnny Reno (1966) - Bellows
A Fine Madness (1966) - Customer (uncredited)
Not with My Wife, You Don't! (1966) - Second Australian (uncredited)
Point Blank (1967) - Guard (uncredited)
Fort Utah (1967) - Henchman (uncredited)
Cool Hand Luke (1967) - Chief (uncredited)
Where Were You When the Lights Went Out? (1968) - Passenger (uncredited)
The Boston Strangler (1968) - Cop (uncredited)
The Split (1968) - Physical Instructor (uncredited)
Rogue's Gallery (1968) - Assailant
The Molly Maguires (1970) - Policeman (uncredited)
Something Big (1971) - Cpl. James
Dirty Harry (1971) - Flower Vendor (uncredited)
The Hound of the Baskervilles (1972, TV Movie) - Seldon (uncredited)
Melinda (1972) - Cop (uncredited)
Slaughter's Big Rip-Off (1973) - Lyle Parker
Hard Times (1975) - Speed's Hitter
The Enforcer (1976) - Huey
Movie Movie (1978) - Hood #3 (segment "Dynamite Hands")
Every Which Way but Loose (1978) - Trucker #1
Hide in Plain Sight (1980) - Frankie Irish
Beyond Evil (1980) - Hospital Attendant
Bronco Billy (1980) - Cowboy at Bar
Cheaper to Keep Her (1980) - Abe
In God We Tru$t (1980) - Paddywagon Driver
Raging Bull (1980) - Cornerman (uncredited)
Any Which Way You Can (1980) - Fight Spectator (uncredited)
...All the Marbles (1981) - Thug #1
The Beastmaster (1982) - Boatman (uncredited)
Little House on the Prairie (1982, TV Series) - Big Arnie
Johnny Dangerously (1984) - Governor
Native Son (1986) - White Man #4
Programmed to Kill (1987) - Cig. Guard
Everybody's All-American (1988) - Bigot
Indio (1989) - Willis - Softball Team Member (uncredited)
The Assassin (1990) - Ed ONeil
Dick Tracy (1990) - The Brow
Sweet Justice (1993) - Rivas Goon
The Enemy Within (1994, TV Movie) - Bowman
Farewell, My Love (2000) - Bouncer #3
Route 666 (2001) - Prison Guard #1
Going Forth by Day (2002) - Performer (segment: "The Deluge")
The Ring (2002) - Ferry Worker
Hood of Horror (2006) - Tex, Sr.
Legion (2010) - Elderly Man (final film role)

References

External links

1927 births
2021 deaths
20th-century American male actors
American male film actors
American male television actors
American stunt performers
Loyola Lions football players
Male actors from California
Military personnel from California
People from Stockton, California
United States Merchant Mariners
United States Navy sailors